Howard Slusher (June 11, 1937 – July 13, 2022) was an American attorney and sports agent. He was known for his aggressive and relentless negotiation style.

List of Howard Slusher clients

Basketball
 Mike Bratz
 Paul Westphal
 Gus Williams

American football

 Gary Barbaro
 Carl Barzilauskas
 Todd Bell
 Richard Bishop
 Tom Brahaney
 Roger Carr

 Sam Cunningham
 John Dutton
 Dan Fouts
 Gordon Gravelle
 Leon Gray
 John Hannah

 Mark Haynes
 Mike Haynes
 John Jefferson
 Crawford Ker
 Bruce Matthews
 Larry Moriarty

 Anthony Muñoz
 Eddie Murray
 Tom Owen
 Tom Skladany
 Jim Smith
 Jeris White

 Randy White
 Charle Young

References

American lawyers
American sports agents
1937 births
2022 deaths